5,6-MDO-DMT, or 5,6-methylenedioxy-N,N-dimethyltryptamine, is a lesser-known psychedelic drug.  It is the 5,6-methylenedioxy analog of DMT. 5,6-MDO-DMT was first synthesized by Alexander Shulgin. In his book TiHKAL (Tryptamines I Have Known and Loved), 5,6-MDO-DMT produces no noticeable psychoactive effects, although it was only tested up to a dose of 5 mg.  Very little data exists about the pharmacological properties, metabolism, and toxicity of 5,6-MDO-DMT.

See also 

 Tryptamine
 Dimethyltryptamine
 5,6-MDO-MiPT
 Psychedelics, dissociatives and deliriants

External links 
 5,6-MDO-DMT Entry in TIHKAL
 5,6-MDO-DMT Entry in TiHKAL • info

Psychedelic tryptamines